WQUT (101.5 FM) is a radio station in Tri-Cities, Tennessee.  The station format is classic rock and is branded as "Tri-Cities Classic Rock 101.5 WQUT."  As of the Fall 2008 Arbitron ratings book, WQUT is the third highest rated station in the Tri-Cities (Johnson City, Tennessee - Kingsport, Tennessee - Bristol Tennessee/Virginia) market (adults 12+) behind country music station WXBQ-FM and adult contemporary WTFM-FM.  Since the early 1990s, WQUT and WTFM have fought for the number two spot in the market, with WXBQ rated the overall number one station since 1993.

WQUT is the flagship station of Cumulus Media Tri-Cities and began broadcasting in 1948 as WJHL-FM at 101.5 Megahertz.  In 1960, the call letters changed to WJCW-FM and its effective radiated power became 100,000 watts in 1973 from its antenna on Buffalo Mountain in Johnson City, Tennessee.

WQUT carries the "John Boy and Billy Big Show" from 6:00 to 10:00 AM Monday through Saturday (a syndicated show carried on many southeastern U.S. stations).  Specialty shows include the Tennessee Midnight Rambler Show (approx. 1976 - 1982), Flashback with Bill St. James and House of Hair with Dee Snider, both on every Sunday night beginning at 6pm.   Its sister stations are WKOS, WJCW (which signed on in 1938), WGOC, and WXSM.

WQUT is involved in community activities throughout the Tri-Cities market.

Translator coverage
WQUT owns a translator in Boone, North Carolina (W285DG) on 104.9 FM, and is located at the Fire Tower where Boone's communication towers are located. Previously, WQUT licensed translators in Lenoir, North Carolina (W232AV) on 94.3 FM and in Hazard, Kentucky (W244BW) on 96.7 FM. The Lenoir translator switched to simulcasting WCQR-FM from Kingsport in the early-2000s, and the Hazard translator switched to simulcasting WZLK from Virgie, Kentucky in the late-2000s.

External links
WQUT official website

 WQUT audio clip from 1989

QUT
Cumulus Media radio stations
Classic rock radio stations in the United States
1948 establishments in Tennessee
Johnson City, Tennessee